Crassiclava balteata is a species of sea snail, a marine gastropod mollusk in the family Pseudomelatomidae.

Description
The length of the shell attains 14.5 mm, its diameter 5.1 mm.

Distribution
This marine species occurs off the Agulhas Bank, South Africa

References

 Kilburn R.N. (1988). Turridae (Mollusca: Gastropoda) of southern Africa and Mozambique. Part 4. Subfamilies Drillinae, Crassispirinae and Strictispirinae. Annals of the Natal Museum. 29(1): 167–320. page(s): 243, figs 185–186

External links
 

Endemic fauna of South Africa
balteata
Gastropods described in 1988